Sadanand Rege सदानंद रेगे (21 June 1923 – 21 September 1982)  was a Marathi poet, playwright, short-story writer, translator, cartoonist and painter. He was born in Rajapur, Ratnagiri, Maharashtra.

During his lifetime, his twenty eight books were published. His three books of poetry won government of Maharashtra award for literary achievements. His translation of Vladimir Mayakovsky's poems into Marathi: 'Pant Ghatlela Dhag' won him Soviet Land Nehru Award.

He was a trained painter and even held two exhibitions of his paintings in Norway where he was traveling.

He taught at Ramnarain Ruia College from 1962 until his death in 1982. Earlier he held a number of jobs including a stint in Indian Railways as a clerk.

Published works

Books

Poetry
 Aksharvel, 1950
 Gandharva, 1960
 Devapudhcha Diva, 1965
 Brankushicha Pakshi, 1980
 Vedya Kavita, 1980

Plays
See 'Translations' below

Short story collections
 Jeevanachi Vastre, 1952
 Kalokhachi Pise, 1954
 Chandane, 1959
 Chandra Savali Korato, 1963
 Masa aani Itar Vilakshan Katha, 1965
 Sadanand Rege: Nivadak Katha: Sampadak: Arvind Gokhale, 1988

Translations into Marathi
 Midia, Popular Prakashan, 1993   (Marathi translation of Euripides's Medea (play))
 Pach Diwas, Popular Prakashan, 1991   (Marathi translation of Henry Zeiger's play 'Five Days', 1965)
 Pant Ghatlela Dhag, 1971 (Marathi translation of Vladimir Mayakovsky) 
 Trunparne, 1982 (Marathi translation of Walt Whitman)
 Jayketu, 1959 Original Writer Sophocles
 Brand, 1963 Original Writer Henrik Ibsen
 Badshah, 1965 Original Writer Eugene O'Neill
 Jyanche Hote Praktan Shapit, 1965 Original Writer Eugene O'Neill
 Gochi, 1974 Original Writer Tadeusz Różewicz
 Raja Idipas, 1977 Original Writer Sophocles
 Chandra Dhalala, 1947 Original Writer John Steinbeck
 Moti, 1950 Original Writer John Steinbeck
 Band, 1958 Original Writer George Orwell
 Tambade Tattu, 1962 Original Writer John Steinbeck
 Chandrotsav, 1966 Original Writer Bette Bao Lord
 Saseholpat, 1968 Original Writer Lin Yutang

References

 'Nivadak Sadanand Rege' Edited by Vasant Abaji Dahake, published by Sahitya Akademi,  1996/2010/2013
 Akshar Gandharv/ Sadanand Rege: Mulakhat-Dayari-Patre by Pra Shri Nerurkar, published by Popular Prakashan, 1987
 An essay titled 'Aksharvel' from a Marathi book 'Jigsaw' by Ramdas Bhatkal, 1997/1998, published by Rajhans Prakashan

External links
 Rege's obituary by Vilas Sarang
Indian poets writing in Marathi
Part 1 of a Marathi newspaper article on Rege's Marathi play 'Gochi'

1923 births
1982 deaths
Marathi people
People from Mumbai Suburban district
Indian male poets
Marathi-language writers
Marathi-language poets
20th-century Indian poets
Poets from Maharashtra
20th-century Indian male writers